Milęcice  is a village in the administrative district of Gmina Lubomierz, within Lwówek Śląski County, Lower Silesian Voivodeship, in south-western Poland.

During World War II, in 1945, the Germans established and operated a subcamp of the Gross-Rosen concentration camp in the village, in which 400 men were imprisoned, mostly Jews, but also Poles, French, and Germans, all transported from the Auschwitz concentration camp.

References

Villages in Lwówek Śląski County